The Monitor was a biweekly English language newspaper published in Sydney, New South Wales and founded in 1826. It is one of the earlier newspapers in the colony commencing publication twenty three years after the Sydney Gazette, the first paper to appear in 1803, and more than seventy years before the federation of Australia.  The Monitor changed name several times, subsequently being known as The Sydney Monitor, and in June 1838 Francis O'Brien and Edwyn Henry Statham introduced themselves as the new editors of the re-branded Sydney Monitor and Commercial Advertiser.

History
The newspaper was first published on 19 May 1826 by Edward Smith Hall and Arthur Hill. The paper was not without controversy in the colony, publicly taking up the cause of the poor and convicts with a motto that "nothing extenuate nor set down aught in malice" and being openly critical of the governing authorities.

Name changes

Digitisation
The various versions of the paper have been digitised as part of the Australian Newspapers Digitisation Program project hosted by the National Library of Australia.

See also
 List of newspapers in Australia
 List of newspapers in New South Wales

References

Further reading

External links

Defunct newspapers published in Sydney
Newspapers established in 1826
Publications disestablished in 1841
Newspapers on Trove
1826 establishments in Australia
1841 disestablishments in Australia